Word Magazine was an  online magazine active from 1995 to 2000.

History
Launched in 1995 by Carey Earle, Tom Livaccari and Dan Pelson, Word Magazine created original stories, interviews, games, applications, music, interactive objects and art, and community spaces. Word published new content daily, and each story was treated as a unique interface design experiment. Word was also a pioneer in the use of online advertising and was the first website to integrate microsites into brand advertising online. It was also one of the first truly web oriented online magazines.

Word's editorial team was originally led by Vibe magazine founding editor Jonathan Van Meter and creative director Jaime Levy. Marisa Bowe took over as editor-in-chief prior to the site's June 1995 launch and Yoshi Sodeoka became Creative Director in early 1996. Daron Murphy was a founding senior editor.

On launch in 1995 Word Magazine was the first to use music/effects soundtracks to their articles using Real Audio with Kit Krash’s soundtrack for John Bowe’s “Big Wheel” to be the first ever use of music audio streaming on that platform (previously only a baseball game was broadcast). The composer Karthik Swaminathan aka Kit Krash from the Illbient band Byzar continued as Word's in house sound designer and main audio producer to the end of the publication where he provided soundtracks for many of the articles and projects as well as having several online radio stations under the Junk Radio section of the magazine.

From 1998, Word featured a chatterbot named Fred the Webmate.

In 2000, Streeter, Bowe, Murphy, Rose Kernochan, and John Bowe co-edited a book of interviews, "Gig: Americans Talk About Their Jobs,"  inspired by Studs Terkel's Working: People Talk About What They Do All Day and How They Feel About What They Do.

Also in 2000, Word staff developed the turn-based online strategy game Sissyfight 2000.

Word won awards from I.D. Magazine and Print Magazine, among others and was placed in the permanent collection of the San Francisco Museum of Modern Art, the Walker Art Center and the Museum of the Moving Image.

Word was originally owned by Icon CMT until its sale in April 1998 to Zapata Corporation. Zapata closed Word.com in August, 2000.

References

External links
The 10 websites that changed the world
Screenshots of Word
 Video: Marisa Bowe, Editor of Word.com discusses the website
 Sissyfight

Defunct websites
Online magazines published in the United States
Magazines established in 1995
Magazines disestablished in 2000
Defunct magazines published in the United States